Piriac-sur-Mer (literally Piriac on Sea) is a commune in the Loire-Atlantique department in western France.

Population

See also
La Baule - Guérande Peninsula
Communes of the Loire-Atlantique department

References

Communes of Loire-Atlantique
Populated coastal places in France